The eastern tubenose goby (Proterorhinus nasalis) is a species of gobiid fish native to fresh and brackish waters of the basins of the Sea of Azov and the Caspian Sea and has invaded the upper reaches of the Volga River from its native occurrence in the delta.  This species prefers slow flowing rivers or still waters with plentiful rocks or vegetation.  It can reach a length of  SL.  It is probably the same species as that recently treated as Proterorhinus semipellucidus (or P. cf. semipellucidus).

References

Eastern tubenose goby
Fish of the Caspian Sea
Fish of Western Asia
Fish described in 1963
Endemic fauna of the Caspian Sea
Eastern tubenose goby